Buschel is a surname. Notable people with the surname include:

Leonard Buschel, American publisher and substance abuse counselor
Noah Buschel (born 1978), American film director and screenwriter